Parthenina is a genus of very small sea snails, pyramidellid gastropod mollusks or micromollusks.

This genus was previously placed in the subfamily Chrysallidinae of the family Odostomiidae. The name Parthenia was created by Lowe in 1840 for the species in this group, but had to be replaced since it was preoccupied by a name for a group of dipterans described by Roubineau-Desvoidy in 1830.

Shell description
In the original description Bucquoy, Dautzenberg & Dollfus (1833) states (in English translation) that Partnenina is a type of Odostomia with a mesh-like surface or with longitudinal ridges. Between these ridges there are series of spiral ridges. Many of the European species in the genus have for a long time been wrongly placed in the genus Chrysallida, but Schander et al. (2003) showed that they should indeed be placed in the genus Parthenina. This separation was followed by Pimenta et al. (2009) for Brazilian species.

The synonymy with Besla Dall & Bartsch, 1904 proposed by Micali et al. (2012) is debatable. The type species of Besla has a protoconch axis at 90° with that of teleoconch ("type A protoconch") whereas that of Parthenina is tilted nearly 180° ("type C"); this important character suggests that they are unrelated and that their teleoconch sculpture may be convergent

Taxonomy
The Eastern Atlantic and Mediterranean species of the family Pyramidellidae, here listed under the genus Parthenina Bucquoy, Dautzenberg & Dollfus, 1883, have been included by most 20th-century European authors in the genus Chrysallida Carpenter, 1856, following a lead by Winckworth (1932). The first explicit statement that this is incorrect was voiced by van Aartsen, Gittenberger & Goud (2000: 21) "None of the many species from European Atlantic and Mediterranean waters currently included in Chrysallida conforms exactly to the description of the genus sensu stricto", but they still used Chrysallida as a genus and used Parthenina and other names as subgenera. Micali, Nofroni & Perna (2012) formally raised Parthenina to the rank of genus and included a number of European species, whereas other congeners not treated in that paper were still listed in WoRMS and elsewhere as Chrysallida. Hoisaeter (2014) transferred some more species but still listed five species under Chrysallida. The current treatment follows Giannuzzi-Savelli, Pusateri, Micali, Nofroni & Bartolini (2014) who provided a quite sensible treatment and transferred the relevant Mediterranean species to Parthenina and other genera, without any species retained in Chrysallida. This scheme yet has to be tested against a phylogenetic hypothesis based on molecular sequence data.

Life history
The genus is parasitic, manly on serpulid polychaete worms. They are known to have spermatophores.

Species
Species within the genus Parthenina include:

 † Parthenina acuticostata (Sorgenfrei, 1958) 
 Parthenina aemulatrix Peñas & Rolán, 2017
 Parthenina affectuosa (Yokoyama, 1927)
 Parthenina alesii Micali, Nofroni & Perna, 2012
 Parthenina altecara Peñas & Rolán, 2017
 Parthenina altinodosa Peñas & Rolán, 2017
 Parthenina altumincile Peñas & Rolán, 2017
 Parthenina angulosa (Monterosato, 1889)
 Parthenina anselmoi (Peñas & Rolán, 1998)
 Parthenina artiumbilici Peñas & Rolán, 2017
 Parthenina assimilis Peñas & Rolán, 2017
 Parthenina basicostata Peñas & Rolán, 2017
 Parthenina basisfuniculata Peñas & Rolán, 2017
 Parthenina biumbilicata Pimenta, 2012
 Parthenina brattstroemi (Warén, 1991)
 Parthenina breviter Peñas & Rolán, 2017
 Parthenina canalesi Peñas & Rolán, 2017
 Parthenina captiosa Peñas & Rolán, 2017
 Parthenina circumsepta Peñas & Rolán, 2017
 Parthenina clathrata (Jeffreys, 1848)
 Parthenina columnalis Peñas & Rolán, 2017
 Parthenina congesta Peñas & Rolán, 2017
 Parthenina conjugata Peñas & Rolán, 2017
 Parthenina connexa (Dautzenberg, 1912)
 Parthenina considerata Peñas & Rolán, 2017
 Parthenina convoluta Peñas, Rolán & Sabelli, 2020
 Parthenina copiosa Peñas & Rolán, 2017
 Parthenina correcta Peñas & Rolán, 2017
 Parthenina curvicostae Peñas & Rolán, 2017
 Parthenina dantarti (Peñas & Rolán, 2008)
 Parthenina decussata (Montagu, 1803)
 Parthenina dekkeri (van Aartsen, Gittenberger & Goud, 2000)
 Parthenina delectabilis Peñas & Rolán, 2017
 Parthenina deminuta Peñas & Rolán, 2017
 Parthenina densesculpta Peñas & Rolán, 2017
 Parthenina digitiformis Peñas & Rolán, 2017
 Parthenina discursa Peñas & Rolán, 2017
 Parthenina dissensa Peñas & Rolán, 2017
 Parthenina dollfusi (Kobelt, 1903)
 Parthenina elegantiae Peñas, Rolán & Sabelli, 2020
 Parthenina emaciata (Brusina, 1866)
 Parthenina excessa Peñas & Rolán, 2017
 Parthenina eximia (Jeffreys, 1849)
 Parthenina expressa Peñas & Rolán, 2017
 Parthenina extenta Peñas & Rolán, 2017
 Parthenina faberi (van Aartsen, Gittenberger & Goud, 2000)
 Parthenina feldi (van Aartsen, Gittenberger & Goud, 2000)
 Parthenina flexuosa (Monterosato, 1874)
 Parthenina gabmulderi (van Aartsen, Gittenberger & Goud, 2000)
 Parthenina indistincta (Montagu, 1908)
 Parthenina intermissa (Thiele, 1925)
 Parthenina interspatiosa (Linden & Eikenboom, 1992)
 Parthenina interstincta (Montagu, 1803) - type species, as Turbo interstinctus
 Parthenina inverta (Laseron, 1959)
 Parthenina iuga (Laseron, 1959)
 Parthenina jeanpaulkrepsi Peñas, Rolán & Swinnen, 2014
 Parthenina josae (van Aartsen, Gittenberger & Goud, 2000)
 Parthenina juliae (de Folin, 1872)
 Parthenina limitum (Brusina in de Folin & Périer, 1876)
 Parthenina marielloides (Yokoyama, 1922)
 Parthenina marquesensis Peñas & Rolán, 2017
 † Parthenina martae Landau & LaFollette, 2015 
 Parthenina mauritanica (Peñas & Rolán, 1998)
 Parthenina meta (Dall & Bartsch, 1906)
 Parthenina microsculpta Peñas & Rolán, 2017
 Parthenina monicae (Saurin, 1958)
 Parthenina monozona (Brusina, 1869)
 Parthenina monterosatii (Clessin, 1900)
 Parthenina moolenbeeki (Amati, 1987)
 Parthenina multicostata (Jeffreys, 1884)
 Parthenina nexa Peñas, Rolán & Sabelli, 2020
 Parthenina nullusdens Peñas & Rolán, 2017
 Parthenina opisthecostae Peñas & Rolán, 2017
 Parthenina orientalis (Nomura, 1936)
 Parthenina pagodula (A. Adams, 1860)
 Parthenina palazzii (Micali, 1984)
 Parthenina parasigmoidea (Schander, 1994)
 Parthenina parvispiralis Peñas & Rolán, 2017
 Parthenina penchynati (Bucquoy, Dautzenberg & Dollfus, 1883)
 Parthenina perfilumserrae Peñas & Rolán, 2017
 Parthenina perforata Peñas, Rolán & Sabelli, 2020
 Parthenina perpetua Peñas, Rolán & Sabelli, 2020
 Parthenina pluracostae Peñas & Rolán, 2017
 Parthenina pluricostulata Peñas & Rolán, 2017
 Parthenina plurifuniculata Peñas & Rolán, 2017
 Parthenina pseudofolinella Peñas & Rolán, 2017
 Parthenina pyttelilla (Schander, 1994)
 Parthenina quantoana (Nomura, 1937)
 Parthenina rinaldii (Micali & Nofroni, 2004)
 Parthenina rudisculpta Peñas & Rolán, 2017
 Parthenina sagamiana (Yokoyama, 1922)
 Parthenina sarsi (Nordsieck, 1972) 
 Parthenina scalarum Peñas & Rolán, 2017
 Parthenina sergei (Nofroni & Schander, 1994)
 Parthenina shibana (Yokoyama, 1927)
 Parthenina solomonensis Peñas & Rolán, 2017
 Parthenina spiculiformae Peñas & Rolán, 2017
 Parthenina sudanensis Peñas, Rolán & Sabelli, 2020
 Parthenina suturalis (Philippi, 1844)
 Parthenina tavianii Peñas, Rolán & Sabelli, 2020
 Parthenina tenuifuniculata Peñas & Rolán, 2017
 Parthenina terebellum (Philippi, 1844)
 Parthenina trialicii Peñas & Rolán, 2017
 Parthenina typica (Laseron, 1959)
 Parthenina ultralaeta (Nomura, 1936)
 Parthenina unavera Peñas, Rolán & Sabelli, 2020
 Parthenina vanuatuensis Peñas & Rolán, 2017
 Parthenina varia (Odé, 1993) 
 Parthenina ventriosa Peñas & Rolán, 2017
 Parthenina vitilevuensis Peñas & Rolán, 2017
 Parthenina wikanderi Høisaeter, 2014
 Parthenina willeminae (van Aartsen, Gittenberger & Goud, 2000)

Species brought into synonymy
 Parthenina atlantica Locard, 1897: synonym of Turbonilla atlantica (Locard, 1897)
 Parthenina bucquoyi Locard, 1886: synonym of Odostomella doliolum (Philippi, 1844)
 Parthenina caduca (Laseron, 1959): synonym of Elodiamea caduca Laseron, 1959
 Parthenina desmoulinsiana Locard, 1886: synonym of Chrysallida terebellum (Philippi, 1844): synonym of 
 Parthenina flexicosta Locard, 1886: synonym of Parthenina interstincta (J. Adams, 1797)
 Parthenina gracilis (Yokoyama, 1926): synonym of Egilina gracilis (Yokoyama, 1926)
 Parthenina incerta Milaschewitsch, 1916: synonym of Spiralinella incerta (Milaschewich, 1916)
 Parthenina monocycla (Yokoyama, 1922): synonym of Parthenina pagodula (A. Adams, 1860)
 Parthenina multicostata (Laseron, 1959): synonym of Elodiamea multicostata Laseron, 1959
 Parthenina ora (Laseron, 1959): synonym of Elodiamea ora Laseron, 1959
 Parthenina proiectura (Laseron, 1959): synonym of Elodiamea proiectura Laseron, 1959
 Parthenina tenuistriata Milaschewitsch, 1909: synonym of Parthenina juliae (de Folin, 1872)

References

 Bucquoy E., Dautzenberg P. & Dollfus G. (1882-1886). Les mollusques marins du Roussillon. Tome Ier. Gastropodes. Paris, J.B. Baillière & fils 570 p., 66 pl. [pp. 1-40, pl. 1-5, February 1882; pp. 41-84, pl. 6-10, August 1882; pp. 85-135, pl. 11-15, February 1883; pp. 136-196, pl. 16-20, August 1883; pp. 197-222, pl. 21-25, January 1884; pp.223-258, pl. 26-30, February 1884; pp. 259-298, pl. 31-35, August 1884; pp.299-342, pl. 36-40, September 1884; p. 343-386, pl. 41-45, February 1885; p. 387-418, pl. 46-50, August 1885; pp. 419-454, pl. pl. 51-60, January 1886; p. 455-486, pl. 56-60, April 1886; p. 487-570, pl. 61-66, October 1886 
 Micali P., Nofroni I. & Perna E. (2012) Parthenina alesii n. sp. from Eastern Mediterranean, and notes on Parthenina dantarti (Peñas & Rolán in Peñas, Rolán & Ballesteros, 2008) (Gastropoda: Heterobranchia: Pyramidellidae). Bollettino Malacologico 48(1): 69–72.
 Tore Høisæter (2014) The Pyramidellidae (Gastropoda, Heterobranchia) of Norway and adjacent waters. A taxonomic review; Fauna norvegica 2014 Vol. 34: 7-78.
 Peñas A. & Rolán E. (2017). Deep water Pyramidelloidea from the central and South Pacific. The tribe Chrysallidini. ECIMAT (Estación de Ciencias Mariñas de Toralla), Universidade de Vigo. 412 pp.

External links 
 Photo of the shell of Parthenina interstincta

Pyramidellidae